The 23rd Canadian Parliament was in session from October 14, 1957, until February 1, 1958. The membership was set by the 1957 federal election on June 10, 1957, and it changed only somewhat due to resignations and by-elections until it was dissolved prior to the 1958 election.

It was the only parliament formally opened by Queen Elizabeth II herself, rather than her formal representative, the governor general.

It was controlled by a Progressive Conservative Party minority under Prime Minister John Diefenbaker and the 18th Canadian Ministry.  The Official Opposition was the Liberal Party, led first by Louis St. Laurent, and then by Lester B. Pearson.

It was the second shortest parliament in Canadian history.

The Speaker was Roland Michener.  See also List of Canadian electoral districts 1952–1966 for a list of the ridings in this parliament.

There was only one session of the 23rd Parliament.

List of members

Following is a full list of members of the twenty-third Parliament listed first by province or territory, then by electoral district.

Electoral districts denoted by an asterisk (*) indicates that district was represented by two members.

Alberta

British Columbia

Manitoba

New Brunswick

Newfoundland

Northwest Territories

Nova Scotia

Ontario

Prince Edward Island

Quebec

Saskatchewan

Yukon

By-elections

References

Succession

Canadian parliaments
1957 establishments in Canada
1958 disestablishments in Canada
1957 in Canada
1958 in Canada
1958 in Canadian politics